Fred Lutkefedder (April 15, 1910 – April 28, 1986) was an American soccer player who was a member of the U.S. soccer team at the 1936 Summer Olympics.

In 1933, Lutkefedder signed with the Philadelphia German-Americans of the American Soccer League.  The German-Americans won the 1936 National Challenge Cup in two games with Lutkefedder coming on as a substitute in the second game.  In 1936, he was selected to play for the U.S. soccer team at the 1936 Summer Olympics.  In 1937, he moved to the New York Americans.  At some point, he moved to the Philadelphia Passon, returning to the German-Americans the 1943-1944 season.  That year the German-Americans won the title.  Lutkefedder retired at the end of the season.

References

External links

1910 births
1986 deaths
American people of German descent
American soccer players
Olympic soccer players of the United States
Footballers at the 1936 Summer Olympics
American Soccer League (1933–1983) players
Uhrik Truckers players
Philadelphia Nationals players
New York Americans (soccer) (1933–1956) players
Association football forwards